Austin Bryant (born November 12, 1996) is an American football defensive end for the Detroit Lions of the National Football League (NFL). He played college football at Clemson.

Early years
Bryant attended Thomas County Central High School in Thomasville, Georgia. He committed to Clemson University to play college football.

College career
As a true freshman at Clemson in 2015, Bryant played in 13 games, recording 22 tackles and 1.5 sacks. He missed the first six games of his sophomore season in 2016, due to a foot injury. He returned from the injury and recorded 12 tackles and 2.5 sacks. Bryant became a starter for the first time his junior year in 2017.

Professional career

Bryant was selected by the Detroit Lions in the fourth round (117th overall) of the 2019 NFL Draft. He was placed on injured reserve on September 2, 2019. He was designated for return on October 30, 2019, and began practicing with the team again. He was activated on November 20, 2019.

Bryant was placed on the active/physically unable to perform list at the start of training camp on August 2, 2020. He was placed on reserve/PUP on September 5, 2020. He was activated on November 7, 2020.

References

External links
Clemson Tigers bio

1996 births
Living people
American football defensive ends
Clemson Tigers football players
Detroit Lions players
People from Brooks County, Georgia
People from Thomas County, Georgia
Players of American football from Georgia (U.S. state)